Lásenice is a municipality and village in Jindřichův Hradec District in the South Bohemian Region of the Czech Republic. It has about 600 inhabitants. It lies on the Nežárka River.

Notable people
Karel Hájek (1900–1978), photographer

References

Villages in Jindřichův Hradec District